Vášnivý bozk (also known as Vášnivý polibek; "Kiss of Passion") is a 1995 Czecho-Slovak psychological drama film starring Jozef Kroner, Ivana Chýlková, and Jiří Bartoška.

Cast
Ivana Chýlková as Hana
Jiří Bartoška as Igor
Szidi Tobias as Blanka
Jozef Kroner as Schneider
Matej Landl as Viktor
Roman Luknár as Lajko
Andrej Hryc as Mário
Katarína Kolníková as grandmother
Ján Mildner as grandfather

Additional credits
 František Lipták - art director
 Katarína Hollá - costume designer
 Michal Holubec - sound
 Petr Dvořák - electrician
 Juraj Solan - score mix

See also
List of Slovak submissions for the Academy Award for Best Foreign Language Film

References

External links

1995 films
Slovak drama films
Czech drama films
Slovak-language films
1990s Czech-language films